Ramón Antonio Rosso (born June 9, 1996) is a Dominican professional baseball pitcher who is currently a free agent. He has played in Major League Baseball (MLB) for the Philadelphia Phillies. Rosso made his MLB debut in 2020.

Career
Rosso was born in Santo Domingo, Dominican Republic to a Spanish father and a Dominican mother. He moved to Spain, pitching for CB Barcelona of the División de Honor de Béisbol.

Los Angeles Dodgers
At 19, Rosso was signed by the Los Angeles Dodgers for a signing bonus of $62,000 on July 2, 2015. He was released by the Dodgers a year later on July 15, 2016, and never pitched in a minor league game for the organization.

Philadelphia Phillies
Rosso was signed by the Philadelphia Phillies, who had offered him a contract prior to his signing with the Dodgers, on June 2, 2017. He debuted for the Dominican Summer League Phillies, pitching to a 6–1 win–loss record with a 0.74 earned run average (ERA) in nine starts and earning a promotion to the Gulf Coast League Phillies. After striking out 13 batters with one earned run in nine innings pitched, Rosso was again promoted and finished the season with the Williamsport Crosscutters of the New York–Penn League. He posted a 1–0 record with a 3.00 ERA and 23 strikeouts in 18 innings pitched with Williamsport. Rosso began the 2018 season with the Lakewood BlueClaws of the South Atlantic League, where he went 5–1 with a 1.33 ERA and 81 strikeouts in 12 starts and was named a league All-Star before being promoted to the Clearwater Threshers of the Florida State League. He pitched in 11 games with 10 starts for Clearwater and went 6–2 with a 2.91 ERA. Rosso began 2019 with the Reading Phillies of the AA Eastern League, where he had a 3–2 record with a 3.15 ERA in ten starts before earning a promotion to the AAA Lehigh Valley IronPigs. He finished the season with Lehigh Valley and went 2–4 with a 5.50 ERA and 64 strikeouts. 

Rosso was invited to Spring Training by the Phillies in 2020. On July 24, 2020, he made his MLB debut. He finished his rookie season with a 6.52 ERA in 7 appearances. He pitched 1.1 scoreless innings for the Phillies in 2021 before being designated for assignment on May 23, 2021. He was outrighted to Triple-A Lehigh Valley on May 28. On September 1, 2021, the Phillies selected Rosso's contract. On November 5, 2021, Rosso was outrighted off of the 40-man roster and elected free agency.

Detroit Tigers
On March 14, 2022, Rosso signed a minor league deal with the Detroit Tigers. He was released on May 27, 2022.

References

External links

1996 births
Living people
Águilas Cibaeñas players
Baseball players at the 2020 Summer Olympics
Medalists at the 2020 Summer Olympics
Olympic medalists in baseball
Olympic bronze medalists for the Dominican Republic
Clearwater Threshers players
Dominican Republic expatriate baseball players in the United States
Dominican Summer League Phillies players
Florida Complex League Phillies players
Lakewood BlueClaws players
Lehigh Valley IronPigs players
Major League Baseball pitchers
Major League Baseball players from the Dominican Republic
Philadelphia Phillies players
Reading Fightin Phils players
Sportspeople from Santo Domingo
Williamsport Crosscutters players
Olympic baseball players of the Dominican Republic